At 18:45 IST on Monday, 2 December 2002, a bomb placed under a seat of a B.E.S.T. bus exploded near the busy Ghatkopar station. The bomb was placed in the rear of a bus near the station and killed two people and injured over 50. Ghatkopar being the final stop, all the passengers in the bus had just alighted and passengers for the return trip had not yet entered the bus. The  people who were killed were those present in the busy station area.

Later, the police defused an unexploded bomb from another BEST bus in SEEPZ industrial area at Andheri.

The police arrested several young men for the blast. All were acquitted in the subsequent trial. One of the arrested Khwaja Yunus, allegedly escaped from the police custody and jumped into a gorge Now it is held that Khwaja Yunus died in police custody of torture and that his body was disposed in the gorge by the police.  The accused policemen are being tried in a fast track court.

This was the first in a series of five bombings against the city within a period of less than nine months. Other bombings included:

 27 January 2003 Mumbai bombing
 2003 Mumbai train bombing
 2003 Mumbai bus bombing
 25 August 2003 Mumbai bombings

See also
 List of terrorist incidents, 2002

References

Terrorist incidents in Mumbai
Improvised explosive device bombings in India
Terrorist incidents in India in 2002
Bus bombings in Asia
History of Mumbai (1947–present)
2000s in Mumbai
December 2002 events in India
2002 murders in India
Disasters in Maharashtra